Genuiyeh or Ganuiyeh or Gonuiyeh or Gonaviyeh may refer to:
 Gonuiyeh, Isfahan
 Genuiyeh, Kiskan, Baft County, Kerman Province
 Gonuiyeh, Ravar, Kerman Province